Engholm is a surname of:

 Björn Engholm (born 1939), German SPD politician. He was Minister-President of Schleswig-Holstein from 1988 to 1993 
 Harry Engholm, British screenwriter
 Johan Engholm (1820-1918), Swedish gunsmith
 Maria Prytz (born 1976; née Engholm),  Swedish curler
Christian Engholm King